Imre Boros (born 18 July 1947) is a Hungarian economist and politician, who served as minister without portfolio and acting Minister of Agriculture in 2001 for a month.

References
 Bölöny, József – Hubai, László: Magyarország kormányai 1848–2004 [Cabinets of Hungary 1848–2004], Akadémiai Kiadó, Budapest, 2004 (5th edition).
 Zsigmond Király Főiskola - Jelenkutató Csoport

1947 births
Living people
People from Zala County
Independent Smallholders, Agrarian Workers and Civic Party politicians
Hungarian Democratic Forum politicians
Agriculture ministers of Hungary
Members of the National Assembly of Hungary (1998–2002)
Members of the National Assembly of Hungary (2002–2006)